Ross Monroe Winter (born July 7, 1981) is an American violinist and teacher.

He is, or has been, a member of the Virginia and Richmond Symphony Orchestras, IRIS Orchestra, and performed with the National Symphony, Baltimore Symphony, New Jersey Symphony, Alabama Symphony, among others. He also currently serves as Principal Second Violin with the Wintergreen Festival Orchestra in Virginia.

He is currently assistant professor of violin at the University of Central Florida. Previously, he held a similar appointment in the University of Northern Iowa School of Music, and at George Mason University, University of Mary Washington, and has taught at Virginia Commonwealth University, New England Conservatory Preparatory School, and given master classes throughout the country. His most notable student has been Robert Downey, Jr. for the film, Sherlock Holmes.

References

1981 births
Living people
American male violinists
21st-century American violinists
21st-century American male musicians
University of Central Florida faculty
University of Northern Iowa faculty
George Mason University faculty
University of Mary Washington faculty
Virginia Commonwealth University faculty